Sindurer Adhikar ( The game of vermilion) is a 1998 Bengali drama film directed by Anup Sengupta. The film music was composed by Anupam Dutta.

Plot
Misunderstandings cause Prijay and Susmita's marriage to fall apart and she moves to her brother Prakash's house. Prijay's illness, however, makes her rethink her decision.

Cast
 Ranjit Mallick
 Prosenjit Chatterjee
 Rituparna Sengupta
 Sabitri Chatterjee
 Kemon Stevenson
 Subhasish Mukhopadhyay
 Anuradha 
Ray
 Finnigan Klann
 Bhaskar Bandyopadhyay
 Mitali Chakraborty

References

External links
 Sindurer Adhikar at the Gomolo

1998 films
1998 drama films
Bengali-language Indian films
1990s Bengali-language films
Films scored by Anupam Dutta
Films directed by Anup Sengupta
Indian drama films